Por Amor a Morelia Michoacán is a live album released by Marco Antonio Solís from Plaza Monumental de Morelia in Morelia, Michoacán, Mexico on October 23, 2015. A DVD was also included with the deluxe edition.

Track listing
All songs written and composed by Marco Antonio Solís

DVD

Charts

References

2015 live albums
Marco Antonio Solís live albums